Euclastaria is a genus of gastropods belonging to the family Cepolidae. 

The species of this genus are found in Central America.

Species:

Euclastaria debilis 
Euclastaria musicola

References

 Bank, R. A. (2017). Classification of the Recent terrestrial Gastropoda of the World. Last update: July 16th, 2017

Cepolidae (gastropods)
Gastropod genera